Abdulkadir Mohamed Farah (15 February 1961 – 24 March 2020) was a Somali footballer.

Career
Born in Beledweyne, Farah began his career in 1976 at schoolboy level, later playing at the regional level before playing club football for Batroolka. He also represented the Somali national team. Farah later worked as an advisor to the Minister of Youth and Sports.

Death
On 24 March 2020, Farah died in a London hospital from COVID-19.

References

1961 births
2020 deaths
Somalian footballers
Somalia international footballers
Deaths from the COVID-19 pandemic in England
Somalian expatriates in the United Kingdom
Association footballers not categorized by position